Praise Martin-Oguike (born August 30, 1993) is a gridiron football defensive end for the Ottawa Redblacks of the Canadian Football League (CFL). He played college football at Temple University. Martin-Oguike has also been a member of the Miami Dolphins, Arizona Cardinals and Seattle Dragons (XFL).

Early life
Martin-Oguike, was born in Abia State, Nigeria.  He is a native of Oka in Isiala Mbano, Imo State.  He moved to Woodbridge Township, New Jersey at the age of 10. Martin-Oguike is the son of Venerable Dr. Martin Oguike (Anglican clergyman and adjunct Professor) and Dr. Ngozi Martin-Oguike (Educator and author) who are both highly regarded in the Igbo community of Nigeria. He has a sister, Precious, and two brothers Percy and Pleasant.

College career 
Martin-Oguike recorded 124 tackles, 20 sacks, 1 interception, 12 forced fumbles, 4 fumble recoveries and 6 blocked field goals during his time at Temple.

Professional career

Miami Dolphins
Martin-Oguike signed with the Miami Dolphins as an undrafted free agent on May 5, 2017. He was waived on September 2, 2017.

Arizona Cardinals
On January 19, 2018, Martin-Oguike signed a reserve/future contract with the Arizona Cardinals. He was waived/injured by the Cardinals on July 26, 2018 and was placed on injured reserve. He was released on August 4, 2018.

Seattle Dragons
In October 2019, the Seattle Dragons selected Martin-Oguike in the tenth round of the 2020 XFL Draft. He had his contract terminated when the league suspended operations on April 10, 2020.

Martin-Oguike was selected by the Blues of The Spring League during its player selection draft on October 11, 2020.

Ottawa Redblacks
Martin-Oguike signed with the Ottawa Redblacks of the CFL on June 4, 2021. On his first two seasons in the CFL Martin-Oguike played in 18 regular season games and contributed with 32 defensive tackles, seven sacks, one forced fumble and one special teams tackle. On February 7, 2023, Martin-Oguike agreed to a one-year contract extension with Ottawa.

References

External links
Temple Owls football bio

1993 births
Living people
People from Woodbridge Township, New Jersey
Players of American football from New Jersey
Sportspeople from Middlesex County, New Jersey
Woodbridge High School (New Jersey) alumni
Nigerian emigrants to the United States
Nigerian players of American football
American football linebackers
Temple Owls football players
Arizona Cardinals players
Seattle Dragons players
The Spring League players
Ottawa Redblacks players
Sportspeople from Abia State